A student leader is any student who takes on the responsibility of spreading knowledge through inspiration, tutoring, campaigns etc.
A student leader strives to change the world by starting with their own community.

Position details
Student leadership positions are often made available through an application process. This process varies from school to school and position to position, some being highly selective, while others are relatively easy to fill. Some student leadership positions are unpaid, while others receive an hourly wage for their work. Many positions that have odd hours or unclear work times will receive a stipend rather than an hourly wage. This is often the case for resident assistants, members of student government, and student representatives on government boards or panels.

In a broader sense, a student leader can take up the responsibility of their community, their city, their country or the world and work towards it with or without the help of a mentor.

Although most student positions on government panels are advisory, the state boards of education of California and Massachusetts include student members with full voting authority.

Examples
A student leader could be any of the following roles.

Primary or secondary school 
 Member of student government, student council, or ASB.
 Teachers aide
 Peer mentor
 Member of any number of student clubs or organizations
 Peer-mediated instruction

School
 Resident Assistant
 Member of student government
 Member of Residence Hall Association or NACURH or NRHH
 Member of incoming freshmen orientation team
 Student assistant or employee
 Member of any number of student clubs or organizations
 Peer-mediated instruction

See also
 Akhil Bharatiya Vidyarthi Parishad

References

Student politics